Clypeopyrenis porinoides is a species of corticolous (bark-loving) lichen in the family Pyrenulaceae. Found in Costa Rica, it was described as new to science in 2011 by Harald Komposch, Jesús Ernesto Hernández Maldonado, and Dania Rosabal. Here the lichen was growing on trunks and undergrowth in a primary forest. The specific epithet porinoides refers to its resemblance to species of Porina.

References

Pyrenulales
Lichen species
Lichens described in 2011
Lichens of Central America